The Noble Park Football Club is an Australian rules football club that fields teams in both the seniors and juniors of the Eastern Football League (EFL) in Melbourne. The club is considered one of Victoria’s most successful breeding grounds for VFL/AFL players.

Due to the club's rich history of Premierships and its contribution to the sport and the community, in 2005, Noble Park was recognised as the only sporting club named by the City of Greater Dandenong, among its 14 sporting heroes' commemorative display.

History
Noble Park was formed in 1918 and played in the Under 21 competition in the Berwick Association until the end of 1933. The club jumper was black with a yellow sash. From 1934 until 1958, Noble Park played in the Dandenong District Association, winning eight premierships.

In 1959 Noble Park merged with the Harrisfield Football Club and became known as Noble Park-Harrisfield Football Club. The club also changed its jumper to royal blue and white vertical stripes.

In 1961, the club adopted the yellow from the original Noble Park jumper and the blue from the Harrisfield jumper to create the blue and gold vertical striped jumper which was worn for most of their existence. Once again the club was known as the Noble Park Football Club. This was also the year that they joined the Caulfield Oakleigh District League where they won two premierships before joining the Federal Football League in 1964.

In the Federal league, Noble Park won two reserves premierships, five under 18 premierships and one senior premiership between 1964 and 1981.

In 1982, Noble Park joined the South East Suburban Football League winning seven under 18 premierships, seven reserves premierships and six senior premierships before the league merged with the Eastern Suburbs Churches Football Association, creating the Southern Football League in 1993.

In the newly formed SFL, Noble Park won two under 18 premierships, seven reserves premierships and three senior premierships.

At the turn of the millennium, Noble Park transferred to the much stronger Eastern Football League, where they became known as the Bulls and changed their jumper to its current design. The Bulls would have to wait until 2003 to win their first EFL premiership, but would not have to wait as long for their second, as the club went back to back, winning the 2004 premiership. The Bulls reserves team also won a premiership in 2004.

In 2010 and 2011, Noble Park went back to back, winning their third and fourth EFL premierships since joining the league in 2000. In 2013 Noble Park made a surprising entrance into the Grand Final where they lost by a significant margin.

Notable former players

External links
Noble Park Football Club Official Web Site
SportingPulse – NPFC

References

Eastern Football League (Australia) clubs
1918 establishments in Australia
Australian rules football clubs established in 1918
Sport in the City of Greater Dandenong